The 1973 Penn State Nittany Lions baseball team represented Pennsylvania State University in the 1973 NCAA University Division baseball season. The head coach was Chuck Bedlar, serving his 11th year.

The Nittany Lions lost in the College World Series, defeated by the Oklahoma Sooners.

Roster

Schedule 

! style="" | Regular Season
|- valign="top" 

|- align="center" bgcolor="#ffcccc"
| 1 || May 29 || at  || Unknown • Williamsburg, Virginia || 1–3 || 0–1
|- align="center" bgcolor="#ccffcc"
| 2 || May 29 || at William & Mary || Unknown • Williamsburg, Virginia || 2–1 || 1–1
|-

|- align="center" bgcolor="#ccffcc"
| 3 || April 7 ||  || Beaver Field • University Park, Pennsylvania || 6–5 || 2–1
|- align="center" bgcolor="#ccffcc"
| 4 || April 11 ||  || Beaver Field • University Park, Pennsylvania || 8–7 || 3–1
|- align="center" bgcolor="#ffcccc"
| 5 || April 14 || at  || Unknown • Piscataway, New Jersey || 3–4 || 3–2
|- align="center" bgcolor="#ccffcc"
| 6 || April 14 || at Rugters || Unknown • Piscataway, New Jersey || 8–0 || 4–2
|- align="center" bgcolor="#ccffcc"
| 7 || April 17 ||  || Beaver Field • University Park, Pennsylvania || 5–2 || 5–2
|- align="center" bgcolor="#ccffcc"
| 8 || April 20 ||  || Beaver Field • University Park, Pennsylvania || 22–3 || 6–2
|- align="center" bgcolor="#ccffcc"
| 9 || April 21 || at  || Unknown • Washington, D. C. || 6–4 || 7–2
|- align="center" bgcolor="#ccffcc"
| 10 || April 24 ||  || Beaver Field • University Park, Pennsylvania || 12–0 || 8–2
|- align="center" bgcolor="#ccffcc"
| 11 || April 26 || at  || Unknown • Gettysburg, Pennsylvania || 4–3 || 9–2
|- align="center" bgcolor="#ffcccc"
| 12 || April 29 || at  || Unknown • Lawrenceville, New Jersey || 0–10 || 9–3
|- align="center" bgcolor="#ccffcc"
| 13 || April 29 || at Rider || Unknown • Lawrenceville, New Jersey || 6–0 || 10–3
|-

|- align="center" bgcolor="#ccffcc"
| 14 || May 4 ||  || Beaver Field • University Park, Pennsylvania || 8–0 || 11–3
|- align="center" bgcolor="#ffcccc"
| 15 || May 6 ||  || Beaver Field • University Park, Pennsylvania || 1–3 || 11–4
|- align="center" bgcolor="#ccffcc"
| 16 || May 6 || Temple || Beaver Field • University Park, Pennsylvania || 3–2 || 12–4
|- align="center" bgcolor="#ccffcc"
| 17 || May 9 ||  || Beaver Field • University Park, Pennsylvania || 17–6 || 13–4
|- align="center" bgcolor="#ccffcc"
| 18 || May 13 ||  || Beaver Field • University Park, Pennsylvania || 17–0 || 14–4
|- align="center" bgcolor="#ccffcc"
| 19 || May 13 || Buffalo || Beaver Field • University Park, Pennsylvania || 6–0 || 15–4
|- align="center" bgcolor="#ccffcc"
| 20 || May 16 || at  || Unknown • Indiana, Pennsylvania || 6–0 || 16–4
|- align="center" bgcolor="#ffcccc"
| 21 || May 16 || at IUP || Unknown • Indiana, Pennsylvania || 0–2 || 16–5
|-

|-
|-
! style="" | Postseason
|- valign="top"

|- align="center" bgcolor="#ccffcc"
| 22 || May 26 || vs  || Unknown • West Windsor, New Jersey || 5–3 || 17–5
|- align="center" bgcolor="#ccffcc"
| 23 || May 26 || vs Buffalo || Unknown • West Windsor, New Jersey || 3–1 || 18–5
|- align="center" bgcolor="#ccffcc"
| 24 || May 26 || vs Temple || Unknown • West Windsor, New Jersey || 4–2 || 19–5
|-

|- align="center" bgcolor="#ffcccc"
| 25 || June 8 || vs Arizona State || Johnny Rosenblatt Stadium • Omaha, Nebraska || 1–3 || 19–6
|- align="center" bgcolor="#ffcccc"
| 26 || June 9 || vs  || Johnny Rosenblatt Stadium • Omaha, Nebraska || 0–6 || 19–7
|-

|-
|

References 

Penn State Nittany Lions baseball seasons
Penn State Nittany Lions baseball
College World Series seasons